Insulin receptor substrate 2 is a protein that in humans is encoded by the IRS2 gene.

Function 

This gene encodes the insulin receptor substrate 2, a cytoplasmic signaling molecule that mediates effects of insulin, insulin-like growth factor 1, and other cytokines by acting as a molecular adaptor between diverse receptor tyrosine kinases and downstream effectors. The product of this gene is phosphorylated by the insulin receptor tyrosine kinase upon receptor stimulation, as well as by an interleukin 4 receptor-associated kinase in response to IL4 treatment.

Mice lacking IRS2 have a diabetic phenotype as well as a 40% reduction in brain mass.

Interactions 

IRS2 has been shown to interact with:
 PLCG1,
 SOCS1, and 
 PIK3R1,

References

Further reading